COMBIMAC is a manufacturer of special electric motors and centrifugal fans located in the town Emmen, the Netherlands.

History

Pelger 
The company was originally founded on 1 November 1919 as Pelger in Rotterdam in the Netherlands by Mr. Willem D. Pelger, with a funding capital of 40 Dutch guilders The company started at the Zwanesteeg 4 in Rotterdam as a direct current electric motor repair shop. In 1920 the first employee was offered a job. Direct current motors were in use in Rotterdam, as a result of the direct current power supply instead of alternating current supply in these early days of electric grid. In March 1926 the company moved to the Paardenstraat 5 and in May 1929 they moved on to the Van Speykstraat 86–102 in Rotterdam. In 1936 a centrifugal fan, brake motors and small induction motors program from another manufacturer named HSM (short for: Heinke-Schuitema-Musselkanaal) in Musselkanaal was bought and brought to Rotterdam.  Mr. K.W. Heinke, one of the former owners and mechanical engineer of HSM also moved to work at the factory in Rotterdam. In the same year 40 off. patents were applied for, with reference to three inventions: the centrifugal switch, the centrifugal fan housing and the principle of a squirrel-cage rotor. The Pelger repair shop gradually evolved into a factory designing and manufacturing special electric motors and centrifugal fans. After some time the two original company names Pelger and HSM were changed into a variant of the existing names: Holland Special Machines Pelger or HSM-Pelger.

Heinke & Schuitema Musselkanaal 

The company Heinke en Schuitema Musselkanaal (HSM) was founded on 1 March 1933 by Mr. Konrad W. Heinke and Mr. Etsko Schuitema as a company to manufacture and repair of electric machines. In 1935 per coincidence contact was made with Mr. G. Ph. van Gelder, general-representative, or sole distributor of this in origin blacksmith fan manufacturer in Musselkanaal and Mr. Pelger. The company was not performing very well and financially in trouble deep. Contact was made with this factory and as a result the company was bought, as well as the inventory and 5 employees moved to Rotterdam. Mr. Schuitema continues the company under E. Schuitema repair company of electric machines, which ends in 1947 as a result of his death. Mr. Heinke keeps all rights on the casting patterns, which are based at: ,  en de .In 1936 the manufacturing and series production at the Pelger factory started. Mr. Heinke initiated further development and introduction of new models. Mr. van Gelder kept the sole distribution rights for the products. The sales and distribution of the products therefore stayed until World War II with Mr. van Gelder's company, Firma G. Ph. van Gelder in Overschie. After World War II a new sales organization was set up: Van Gelder & Pelger. On 9 June 1950 the company Pelger N.V. was founded with a funding capital of 500.000,-- Dutch guilders. In 1951 it was decided the sales and distribution of the produced goods would be done by the company Pelger itself, by means a separate sales office located at the Groenendaal 25 in Rotterdam.

World War II 

At the beginning of World War II, the company had a narrow escape during the Rotterdam Blitz, or bombing of Rotterdam. The limit of the burned down zone (Dutch substantive: brandgrens) came very close to the factory, located at the Van Speykstraat 102. During World War II under the occupation of the German Regime the factory continued to work almost up to the end of the war. Mr. van Gelder had to end the cooperation on behalf of German orders received and went into hiding and stayed under cover. Also the name of the trade company Firma G.Ph. van Gelder could no longer be used and was replaced by Handelsonderneming H.S.M.-HOLLAND.In 1941 the factory was declared as enemy of the Germany Regime and in 1943 the factory was forced to work for the German industry. The company  (the so-called ) raised an order to manufacture refrigerator motors for the company Alfred Teves. The production of the motors was sabotaged by the employees and management, endangering personal lives. On 1st 1944 in small committee the 25 anniversary of the company was celebrated. A few days later during the Rotterdam Razzia (or Roundup) on 6 November 1944 all the raw materials were collected from the factory and on 10 November all the machinery were collected and transported to Germany. Mr. Heinke who had German roots and NSDAP sympathies, had gained the title of Rüstung-Inspektor der Rüstung und Kriegsprodukten in the Netherlands, assisted the transport. Mr. Heinke wanted to continue the development of the repulsion motor, on which a patent was pending for his own account. Mr. J. Vos an employee of the company and Head of the test laboratory was put to work as a forced laborer in Zwickau. After the war Mr. Vos managed to find the machinery taken from the Pelger factory, as he stayed in contact with Mr. Heinke. He found the machinery were stored at the Tischlerei Max Siegert in Frankhausen, also Mr. Heinke's former home. The machinery which were in the possession of Mr. Heinke's widow, as Mr. K.W. Heinke passed away shortly after the war. The machinery were officially confiscated by the American Occupation Authorities in Crimmitschau and were brought back to the Netherlands.

Emmen 

After moving premises within Rotterdam a couple of times to larger facilities, in 1957 the factory moved from the city of Rotterdam to the town of Emmen. The factory location at the Van Speykstraat 102 in Rotterdam became to small and it was located too near to the city center. The available subsidy in the Emmen region to attract new businesses and industries, the available areas on a new developed industrial estate and the high unemployment in this region, initiated the move to the other part of the country and to relocate the factory. The available workers, although often poorly technically educated, could with help of the local technical schools and the company's own internal technical education be transformed to well skilled employees. In the years to follow, the management is being transferred to the sons of Mr. J.W. Pelger. Mr. K.D. Pelger becomes technical director of the factory in Emmen. Mr. W.C. Pelger becomes sales director of the Rotterdam sales office, which stayed in Rotterdam until 1971. The company grew to 130 Fte's in Emmen en 10 Fte's in Rotterdam. In 1969 the company Pelger was taken over by Mr. L Bood. Both Mr. K.D. Pelger and Mr. W.C. Pelger stayed on in the board of directors as purchase director and sales director respectively.

Strike 
In 1972 a dispute arose between the Mr. L. Bood the managing director and an employee Mr. A. Platje, member of the Dutch communist party, about rights and obligations under the labour law. The unions got involved and strikes were initiated. The dispute ended up in the longest strike in the electrotechnical industry in the Netherlands, which lastet for almost half a year and several court cases were held.  The Dutch Union NVV (Nederlands Verbond van Vakverenigingen) with chairman  (quote: we will strike until the company ceases) was not willing to  amend their demands and as a result the company went into receivership. This made an ending to the Pelger era and 102 Fte's lost their jobs. The company received national notoriety, due to all the publicity. To continue the employment of the workers a foundation was raised, named Stichting voor behoud van Werkgelegenheid: Combinatie Machines Apparaten en Constructies, or in short COMBIMAC. In the committee of the foundation the following people were appointed: Mr. P.J.S. de Jong, former Prime Minister of the Netherlands and Minister of Defense. Mr. A. Jellesma, director of company W. Hubert & Co. in Sneek and Mr. W. de Vries director of company Hydro-Holland in Meppel. The company continued with 35 Fte's. In 1976 Mr. P.W. Glasmacher, working as a vice director at that time in the company, takes over the foundation and transfers it back into a company: Machine- en Apparatenfabriek Combimac B.V. In 1993 Mr. H.J. Robben en Mr. M.J.T. de Zwart, by means of a management buyout, took over the company.

Products

Electric motors

Naval ships 
The company started in 1919 as a repair shop for direct current machines and transformed during the history into a designer and manufacturer of special electric motors. These electric motors are designed to drive and rotate all kinds of equipment, including pumps, compressors, winches, thrusters and radar systems, such as the SMART-L. Throughout the history the development of dedicated electric motors on board naval vessels became more prominent. The first motors supplied were shock resistant low magnetic direct current motors in the 1950s for the Dutch  minehunters. Direct current motors nowaday are being replaced by alternating current motors for usage on board MCMV's (mine counter measures vessels) or Minehunters and Minesweepers. Two different types of motors are used: low magnetic and low magnetic strayfield compensated. The latter is a low magnetic electric motor provided with compensating coils, which reduce the emanating magnetic fields, providing a reduced magnetic and acoustic signature, to avoid sea mines to magnetically or acoustically activated. The development of shock proof electric low noise motors started in the 1960s for usage on board the Dutch Dolfijn class submarines.

Tanks 

In the 1970 's contact was made with the German company AEG in Hamburg en Essen. This company was a major sub supplier to the German company Krauss-Maffei AG (nowadays: Krauss-Maffei Wegmann) designer of the Leopard 2 battle tanks. As a result of the Dutch Army procurement of this tank and the industrial compensation obligations, Combimac became co-manufacturer of the company AEG and supplied several electric motors for specific drives during the 1980s. In the same period NBC electric fan units had been developed for the French company Éstablissements Neu (currently: Howden) in Lille for use on board the French AMX30 battle tanks. At the beginning of this century direct contact was made with the French company GIAT (currently: Nexter Systems) designer of the Leclerc battle. Two types of electric fan units were developed for the NBC (Nuclear, Bacterial en Chemical) air filter systems. In the year 2015 Krauss-Maffei Wegmann merged with the company Nexter Systems.

Luxury yachts 

In 2005 the development of rim drive thruster motors was initiated. The revolutionary compact lateral thruster was developed by two separate partnerships: Rolls-Royce with Smartmotor from Trondheim and Van der Velden® Marine Systems with Combimac. The electrical permanent magnet motor has the form of a thin ring. Its stator is incorporated in the tunnel and its rotor carries propeller blades. Waterflow through the unit is unobstructed since there is no gearbox in the tunnel, nor are struts needed to support a hub. Together these factors give a high total efficiency and reduced noise and vibration, due to no cavitation as result of a low tip speed of the propeller blades. The prototype was successfully tested at the MARIN (Maritime Research Institute Netherlands)  The patented thruster design has won two innovation design prices. The permant magnet motor technology was also implemented for the development of the motor/generators in hybrid drive systems on board super yachts

Centrifugal fans 
The original centrifugal fan designs were bought from a company HSM (Heinke-Schuitema-Musselkanaal) located in the town of Musselkanaal in 1936. Throughout the history the program of centrifugal fans has been extended with various models, including ATEX fans for use in hazardous environments. ATEX centrifugal fan units are built in accordance with the European directive 2014/34/EU (previously 94/9/EG). ATEX centrifugal fan units are widely used in the biogas industry to provide the combustion engine gas with ample pressure and suitable for usage in Zone 1 and 2.

Pumps 
The manufacture of electrical driven submersible pumps was introduced during the 1960s. The company predominately produced submersible pumps for sewage treatment plants and building constructions sites. The manufacture of pumps continued until the 1990s and was ended, as the demand for these specific pumps vanished over the years.

External links 
 Official website
 ATEX directive 2014/34/EU
 Wärtsilä – Encyclopedia of Ship Technology – Rim Thruster Drive

Users

Mine Counter Measures Vessels 

 Lerici class minehunter
 Tripartite class minehunter
 Oksøy class mine hunter
 Huon class minehunter
 Sandown class minehunter
 Kormoran 2 class minehunter
 Katanpää class mine countermeasure vessel
 Bedok class mine countermeasures vessel
 Styrsö class mine countermeasures vessel
 
 A-class mine countermeasures vessel
 List of minesweeper classes

Submarines 

 Walrus class
 Swiftsure class
 Trafalgar class
 Vanguard class
 Dreadnought class
 Astute class
 Barracuda class
 S-80 class
 Type 209 submarine
 Type 214 submarine
 Type 218 submarine
 Jangbogo III submarine

ATEX see also 
 Electrical equipment in hazardous areas
 ATEX directive
 ATEX guidelines

References 

Electric motor manufacturers
Manufacturing companies of the Netherlands
Manufacturing companies established in 1919
Dutch companies established in 1919